The 1964–65 Tercera División (3rd level of the Spanish football league system) season was the 29th since its establishment.

League tables

Group I

Group II

Group III

Group IV

Group V

Group VI-VII

Group VIII

Group IX

Group X

Group XI

Group XII

Group XIII

Group XIV

Group XV

Promotion playoff

Champions

First round

Tiebreaker

Final Round

Tiebreaker

Runners-up

First round

Tiebreakers

Second round

Final Round

Tiebreakers

Season records
 Most wins: 26, Rayo Vallecano.
 Most draws: 15, Madrileño.
 Most losses: 29, Atlètic Gironella.
 Most goals for: 107, Calvo Sotelo Andorra.
 Most goals against: 119, Atlètic Gironella.
 Most points: 56, Rayo Vallecano.
 Fewest wins: 1, Alaior.
 Fewest draws: 1, Menorca, Atlètic de Ciutadella, Maó and Manacor.
 Fewest losses: 0, Rayo Vallecano.
 Fewest goals for: 6, Alaior.
 Fewest goals against: 8, Atlético Baleares and Menorca.
 Fewest points: 8, San Esteban and Alaior.

Notes

External links
RSSSF 
Futbolme 

Tercera División seasons
3
Spain